Bay City is a city in Tillamook County, Oregon, United States. The population was 1,286 at the 2010 census.

Geography

Climate
This region experiences warm (but not hot) and dry summers, with no average monthly temperatures above .  According to the Köppen Climate Classification system, Bay City has a warm-summer Mediterranean climate, abbreviated Csb on climate maps.

Demographics

2010 census
As of the census of 2010, there were 1,286 people, 546 households, and 352 families living in the city. The racial makeup of the city was 92.7% White, 0.8% Native American, 0.9% Asian, 0.1% Pacific Islander, 3.3% from other races, and 2.3% from two or more races. Hispanic or Latino of any race were 6.7% of the population.

There were 546 households, of which 24.9% had children under the age of 18 living with them, 51.5% were married couples living together, 7.5% had a female householder with no husband present, 5.5% had a male householder with no wife present, and 35.5% were non-families. 24.4% of all households were made up of individuals, and 10.4% had someone living alone who was 65 years of age or older. The average household size was 2.36 and the average family size was 2.80.

The median age in the city was 46.5 years. 19.4% of residents were under the age of 18; 7.1% were between the ages of 18 and 24; 22.4% were from 25 to 44; 30.3% were from 45 to 64; and 21.2% were 65 years of age or older. The gender makeup of the city was 50.9% male and 49.1% female.

2000 census
As of the census of 2000, there were 1,149 people, 493 households, and 336 families living in the city. The population density was 903.4 people per square mile (349.3/km2). There were 579 housing units at an average density of 455.2 per square mile (176.0/km2). The racial makeup of the city was 93.73% White, 0.44% African American, 1.74% Native American, 0.70% Asian, 0.17% Pacific Islander, 0.87% from other races, and 2.35% from two or more races. Hispanic or Latino of any race were 3.13% of the population.

There were 493 households, out of which 24.3% had children under the age of 18 living with them, 58.6% were married couples living together, 6.9% had a female householder with no husband present, and 31.8% were non-families. 26.4% of all households were made up of individuals, and 11.8% had someone living alone who was 65 years of age or older. The average household size was 2.33 and the average family size was 2.81.

In the city, the population was spread out, with 20.3% under the age of 18, 6.6% from 18 to 24, 26.5% from 25 to 44, 27.5% from 45 to 64, and 19.1% who were 65 years of age or older. The median age was 43 years. For every 100 females, there were 94.1 males. For every 100 females age 18 and over, there were 95.7 males.

The median income for a household in the city was $33,375, and the median income for a family was $41,563. Males had a median income of $33,558 versus $21,827 for females. The per capita income for the city was $18,731. About 9.1% of families and 12.4% of the population were below the poverty line, including 17.2% of those under age 18 and 8.4% of those age 65 or over.

Arts and culture 
The Bay City Arts Center is a non-profit organization that supports arts programs and events.

Notable people
Nellie Owens, one of three people upon whom the character of Nellie Oleson from Little House on the Prairie was based, lived in Bay City with her husband and children.

References

External links

Entry for Bay City in the Oregon Blue Book

Cities in Oregon
Populated coastal places in Oregon
Cities in Tillamook County, Oregon
1910 establishments in Oregon
Populated places established in 1910